Seventy Six is an unincorporated community in Clinton County, Kentucky, United States. Seventy Six is 6.9 miles north of Albany. Its post office  has been closed.

The community was named after nearby Seventy Six Falls.

See also
 List of places with numeric names

References

Unincorporated communities in Clinton County, Kentucky
Unincorporated communities in Kentucky